Some treaties that confer jurisdiction on the ICJ include :

American treaty on pacific settlement, Bogotá, 30 April 1948
Convention on the prevention and punishment of the crime of genocide, Paris, 9 December 1948
Revised act for the pacific settlement of international disputes, Lake Success, 28 April 1949
Convention relating to the status of refugees, Geneva, 28 July 1951
Treaty of peace with Japan, San Francisco, 8 September 1951
Treaty of friendship (India/Philippines), Manila, 11 July 1952
Universal copyright convention, Geneva, 6 September 1952
European convention for the peaceful settlement of disputes, Strasbourg, 29 April 1957
Single convention on narcotic drugs, New York, 30 March 1961
Optional protocol to the Vienna convention on diplomatic relations, concerning the compulsory settlement of disputes, Vienna, 18 April 1961
International convention on the elimination of all forms of racial discrimination, New York, 7 March 1966
Convention on the law of treaties, Vienna, 23 May 1969
Convention on the suppression of the unlawful seizure of aircraft, The Hague, 16 December 1970
Treaty of commerce (Benelux/USSR), Brussels, 14 July 1971
Convention for the suppression of unlawful acts against the safety of civil aviation, Montreal, 23 September 1971
International convention against the taking of hostages, New York, 17 December 1979
General peace treaty (Honduras/El Salvador), Lima, 30 October 1980
United Nations Convention against torture and other cruel, inhuman or degrading treatment or punishment, New York, 1985
Convention on treaties concluded between States and international organizations or between international organizations, Vienna, 21 March 1986
United Nations convention against illicit traffic in narcotic drugs and psychotropic substances, Vienna, 20 December 1988
United Nations framework convention on climate change, New York, 9 May 1992
Convention on biological diversity, Rio de Janeiro, 5 June 1992
Convention on the prohibition of the development, production, stockpiling and use of chemical weapons and their destruction, Paris, 13 January 1993

International Court of Justice
International Court of Justice treaties